The Congress of Panama (also referred to as the Amphictyonic Congress, in homage to the Amphictyonic League of Ancient Greece) was a congress organized by Simón Bolívar in 1826 with the goal of bringing together the new republics of Latin America to develop a unified policy towards the repudiated mother country Spain. Held in Panama City from 22 June to 15 July,  proposed creating a league of American republics, with a common military, a mutual defense pact, and a supranational parliamentary assembly. 

It was attended by representatives of Gran Colombia (comprising the modern-day nations of Colombia, Ecuador, Panama, and Venezuela), Peru, the United Provinces of Central America (Guatemala, El Salvador, Honduras, Nicaragua, and Costa Rica), and Mexico. Chile and the United Provinces of South America (Argentina) declined to attend, out of mistrust of Bolívar's enormous influence. The Empire of Brazil did not send delegates, because it expected a hostile reception from its Hispanic neighbours due to its ongoing war with Argentina over modern Uruguay. The isolationist Paraguay (which refused previous delegates from Bolívar) was not invited.

The grandly titled "Treaty of Union, League, and Perpetual Confederation" that emerged from the congress was ultimately ratified only by Gran Colombia, and Bolívar's dream soon foundered irretrievably with civil war in that nation, the disintegration of Central America, and the emergence of nationalism. The Congress of Panama also had political ramifications in the United States. President John Quincy Adams and Secretary of State Henry Clay wanted the US to attend the congress, to which they had only been invited due to pressure on Bolívar. Since Hispanic America had mostly outlawed slavery, politicians from the Southern United States held up the mission by not approving funds or confirming the delegates. Despite their eventual departure, one of the two US delegates, Richard Clough Anderson Jr., died en route to Panama; and the other, John Sergeant, arrived only after the Congress had concluded its discussions.

Great Britain, which attended with only observer status, managed to acquire many favorable trade deals with Latin American countries at the Congress.

See also 

José Faustino Sánchez Carrión

Notes

Bibliography 
 Reza, Germán A. "Was France Invited to the Amphictyonic Congress of Panama in 1826? Evidence at the Margins of an International Controversy." Critical History 72 (2019): 27-44. online
 Sanders, Ralph. "Congressional Reaction in the United States to the Panama Congress of 1826." The Americas (1954): 141-154. online
 Germán A. de la Reza, El Congreso de Panamá de 1826 y otros ensayos de integración en el siglo XIX. Estudio y fuentes documentales anotadas, UAM-Eon, México, 2006. .

External links 
 Congreso de Panamá The Memoirs of Simon Bolivar

History of Panama
1826 in South America
1826 in politics
Panama
June 1826 events
July 1826 events
1826 conferences